The 2012 Houston Cougars football team represented the University of Houston in the 2012 NCAA Division I FBS football season. It was the 67th year of season play for Houston. The season marked the last for the Cougars as a member of Conference USA as they moved to the American Athletic Conference in 2013. In addition, it was the final season for the team to host its home games at Robertson Stadium as the university announced plans to begin construction on TDECU Stadium in December 2012—following the conclusion of the season. The 2012 season was the first full season under head coach Tony Levine as he took over for Kevin Sumlin after his departure following the 2011 Conference USA Football Championship Game.

At one time it was believed that the 2012 season would be the last for the foreseeable future with a Bayou Bucket Classic matchup against the Rice Owls. Both teams had relied on the game being on their respective conference schedules. However, with the American Athletic Conference move in 2013 for the Cougars, the matchup would have had to have been scheduled as a non-conference game. At the time of the Big East Conference announcement, Rice had its non-conference schedule completely booked for the 2013 and 2014 seasons. In April 2012, the two schools announced that they had come to an agreement to extend the series through the 2013 season. The 2012 and 2013 Bayou Bucket Classics were hosted at Reliant Stadium.

Pre-season

Recruits

Awards & award watch lists
Jacolby Ashworth
Lombardi Award watch list

D. J. Hayden
Jim Thorpe Award watch list

Richie Leone
Ray Guy Award watch list

Charles Sims
Maxwell Award watch list

Schedule

Coaching staff

Game summaries

Texas State

Louisiana Tech

@ UCLA

1st quarter scoring: UCLA – Eric Kendricks 23-yard fumble recovery (K. Fairbairn kick); UCLA – Datone Jones 7-yard pass from Brett Hundley (Fairbairn kick)

2nd quarter scoring: UCLA – Fairbairn 35-yard field goal

3rd quarter scoring: UCLA – Jordon James 12-yard pass from Hundley (Fairbairn kick); UCLA – Fairbairn 23-yard field goal; UCLA – Fairbairn 33-yard field goal

4th quarter scoring: HOU – David Piland 86-yard run (Kenneth Farrow rush failed); UCLA – Steven Manfro 14-yard run (Fairbairn kick)

vs Rice

North Texas

UAB

@ SMU

UTEP

@ East Carolina

Tulsa

@ Marshall

Tulane

Poll rankings

References

Houston
Houston Cougars football seasons
Houston Cougars football